Playfish was a developer of free-to-play social network games. Playfish was founded in 2007 by Kristian Segerstråle, Sebastien de Halleux, Sami Lababidi, and Shukri Shammas. It closed in 2013. Playfish in the past had attracted up to 55 million users a month, with over 37 million users coming from Facebook users. In October 2008, they secured US$17 million in venture capital funding from Accel Partners and Index Ventures. The company was acquired by Electronic Arts in 2009, with the last of Playfish's games being retired in 2013.

History
Who has the Biggest Brain? was the company's first release. It was one of the first Facebook games to attract millions of daily players, and allowed the company to raise the funding necessary to produce other games. The company made money by selling virtual goods inside its games.

On Monday, November 9, 2009, Electronic Arts announced their acquisition of Playfish for $400 million. The acquisition was initially for $275 million cash and $25 million in equity—with a further $100 million in performance-based bonuses available if the company hits targets set by EA executives. As of February 2013, all four of the original founders have left the company, with Lababidi and Shammas setting up educational developer Mindshapes, and Segerstråle returning to the world of startups.

On June 14, 2013, all of the Playfish-developed games have been retired while Madden NFL 13 Social was retired on September 2, 2013 and can no longer be played on Facebook. The last 3 games to be retired (Pet Society, The Sims Social, and SimCity Social) were retired on June 17, 2013.

List of games

Notable games

Restaurant City
In Restaurant City, players own a restaurant in a set environment. The goal is to run an exceedingly popular restaurant and increase in restaurant level and dish quality. A restaurant needs at least two employees to function; a chef and a waiter. Through popularity, a restaurant can attract more customers. As a restaurant attracts more customers, it needs more employees. A restaurant gains the ability to hire more employees as it rises in level. The restaurant also grows in size as it gains levels, and can serve drinks and grow certain ingredients in a garden. 

At its peak, Restaurant City had more than 18 million monthly active users. This number dropped to 1.8 million by 2012, and the game was retired on June 29, 2012.

Pet Society

In Pet Society, players own virtual pets in a "neighborhood." Players can dress up their pets, decorate their homes, go fishing, cook dishes, and dig for treasures. Gaining "paw points" allows players to eventually level up to Level 100. Players can also send gifts and do a crafting challenge to make an item. It was announced on April 15, 2013 that the game would be retired on June 14, 2013, however it was retired on June 17, 2013 instead.

Madden NFL Superstars
Madden NFL Superstars is a spin-off of the popular Madden NFL American football video game series. Players create a team out of current real-life NFL players and compete in 3 different types of games: league games against computer generated teams, scrimmage games against friends, and scrimmage games against real NFL teams. As players progress they collect coins to purchase upgrades to their stadiums, collect fans, hire NFL coaches, and purchase tiered rating level card packs of NFL players to add to their rosters. It was retired on May 14, 2013, while replaced with Madden NFL 13 Social, which retired on September 2, 2013.

The Sims Social

The Sims Social is a Facebook addition to The Sims franchise. This game took place in a fictional town called Littlehaven. In The Sims Social, players create their own Sim, or character, which they can customize. They can then interact with the Sims of their friends, decorate their home, advance their Sim in their dream job and develop romantic relationships. The game often taking some inspirations based on famous public figures such as Lady Gaga and Elvis Presley. Unlike other The Sims games, only one NPC was introduced and can interact with player's Sim, Bella Goth.

On February 9, 2012, The Sims Social won the Social Networking Game of the Year award at the 15th Annual Interactive Achievement Awards and February 15, 2012, the game was nominated for best online browser game by the British Academy Video Game Awards - a subsidiary of the British Academy of Film and Television Arts. It was announced on April 15, 2013 that the game would be retired on June 14, 2013, however it was retired on June 17, 2013 instead.

SimCity Social

SimCity Social is a city building game which allows the player to build city. This is the Facebook game version of the SimCity franchise. It was announced on April 15, 2013 that the game would be retired on June 14, 2013, however it was retired on 17 June 2013 instead.

Playfish Cash
Players were eligible to buy "Playfish Cards" at Walmart, Walgreens, and Toys "R" Us stores. Once redeemed on the Playfish website, players earn "Playfish Cash" (PFC) to spend on virtual goods in games.

Prior April 19, 2011, all active Playfish games used a uniform premium currency called "Playfish Cash", and among players it was often called PFC. Playfish Cash could be used for all Playfish games in one. Later, the premium currency was changed into individual cash types for each game.

Marketing
In August 2011, Playfish was confirmed as the official shirt sponsor of the newly formed, supporter owned English football club AFC Rushden & Diamonds.

Notes

References

External links

Official Playfish website 
Playfish forum

Electronic Arts
Myspace
Companies based in the Royal Borough of Kensington and Chelsea
British companies established in 2007
British companies disestablished in 2013
Video game companies established in 2007
Video game companies disestablished in 2013
Defunct video game companies of the United Kingdom
Video game development companies
Facebook games
Defunct companies based in London